Wartime may refer to:

 Wartime, Saskatchewan, a small community in Saskatchewan, Canada
 Wartime, a formal state of war, as opposed to peacetime
 Wartime (film), a 1987 science fiction film spin-off of the TV series Doctor Who
 Wartime: Understanding and Behavior in the Second World War, a 1989 book by Paul Fussell

See also